Cyana ueleana is a moth of the family Erebidae. It was described by Timm Karisch in 2003. It is found in the Democratic Republic of the Congo.

References

ueleana
Moths described in 2003
Endemic fauna of the Democratic Republic of the Congo
Insects of the Democratic Republic of the Congo
Moths of Africa